The Dr14 is a heavy shunting locomotive used by VR Group. Some of the locomotives can be radio controlled.

History 
VR ordered 24 locomotives to improve the efficiency of shunting work, which was back then mainly done with class Vr3 steam locomotives. Two locomotives were delivered for testing purposes in 1969, with the main series being delivered between 1970 and 1972. Until 1976, the Dr14 was known as the Vr12.

The locomotives are used at the biggest Finnish rail yards at Helsinki, Riihimäki, Tampere, Seinäjoki, Kouvola, Imatra and Pieksämäki.

References

Literature

External links 
 

B′B′ locomotives
Dr14
Dr14
Railway locomotives introduced in 1969
5 ft gauge locomotives